Kenneth William Kwapis (born August 17, 1957) is an American film and television director, screenwriter, and author. He specialized in the single-camera sitcom in the 1990s and 2000s and has directed feature films such as Sesame Street Presents: Follow That Bird (1985), The Sisterhood of the Traveling Pants (2005), and He's Just Not That Into You (2009).

Personal life
Kwapis was born in East St. Louis, Illinois, and grew up in neighboring Belleville. He is the son of Marge and Bruno Walter Kwapis, who was an oral surgeon. He is of Polish descent and was raised Catholic, attending the Jesuit preparatory academy St. Louis University High School.

He earned a Bachelor's degree at Northwestern University's School of Speech, after which he traveled west to enroll in the M.F.A. program at the USC School of Cinema-Television.

Kwapis' twenty-four-minute thesis film, For Heaven's Sake, won the Student Academy Award in 1982. The film is a contemporary adaptation of Mozart's one-act opera Der Schauspieldirektor (The Impresario).

Family
Kwapis is married to author and film director Marisa Silver, with whom he has two sons: Henry and Oliver.

Career

1980s
In 1983, Kwapis directed Revenge of the Nerd for CBS' Afternoon Playhouse, followed by Summer Switch for ABC's Afterschool Special. Starring Robert Klein, Summer Switch is an adaptation of the novel of the same name, the sequel to a young adult fantasy, Freaky Friday. For the Scholastic Book Company, Kwapis directed his first feature film The Beniker Gang, starring Andrew McCarthy.

Kwapis' next film was Sesame Street Presents: Follow That Bird (Warner Bros., 1985). The film was the big-screen debut of the Sesame Street ensemble (Big Bird, Oscar the Grouch, The Count, Bert & Ernie, et al.). Follow That Bird tells the story of Big Bird's quest to live with a family of his own kind; namely, birds. A social worker arranges for Big Bird to move in with a family of Dodo Birds in Oceanview, Illinois.

In 1987, Kwapis made his prime time television debut, directing an installment of Steven Spielberg's Amazing Stories.

Kwapis' second feature Vibes (Columbia, 1988) was made under Ron Howard and Brian Grazer's fledgling Imagine banner. Written by Lowell Ganz and Babaloo Mandel, Vibes is the tale of two psychics (Jeff Goldblum and Cyndi Lauper) who are enlisted by a fortune hunter (Peter Falk) to divine the whereabouts of a treasure hidden in the Andes. The film was shot on location in Ecuador, and features a pan pipe-flavored score by James Horner.

1990s
Kwapis began the 1990s with a feature-film project, He Said, She Said (Paramount, 1991)—co-directed by his now-wife Marisa Silver. The film, written by Brian Hohlfeld, is a romantic comedy in which the same events are recounted twice—once from each partner's point of view. The woman's (Elizabeth Perkins) portion of the film was directed by Silver and the man's (Kevin Bacon) by Kwapis. The film also features Sharon Stone and Nathan Lane. Silver gave the film its title, based on a phrase that has been used to mean either "cross-gender discourse" or "testimony in direct conflict."

Kwapis then moved into series television, directing the pilot of HBO's comedy The Larry Sanders Show, which influenced many subsequent shows. He directed twelve episodes of the series.

Kwapis also contributed two episodes to the sci-fi series Eerie, Indiana.

Kwapis' fourth feature, Dunston Checks In (Twentieth Century Fox, 1996), stars Jason Alexander as the manager of a grand hotel in New York City, which is owned and operated by a tyrant in the Leona Helmsley mold (Faye Dunaway). An aristocrat of dubious origin (Rupert Everett) checks into the hotel with an orangutan jewel thief.

Kwapis' next film, The Beautician and the Beast (Paramount, 1997), evokes the Ruritanian comedies of Ernst Lubitsch. Fran Drescher plays a New York cosmetologist who is mistakenly hired to tutor the children of the despotic president of Slovetzia (Timothy Dalton).

In the late 1990s, Kwapis directed two episodes of NBC's short-lived cult following show Freaks and Geeks.

2000s
In the first decade of the 2000s, Kwapis directed nineteen episodes of Fox's Malcolm in the Middle, earning a Primetime Emmy Award nomination for his work as a producer-director.

In 2001, Kwapis helped develop The Bernie Mac Show for Fox, directing the pilot and ten additional episodes, including the series finale, "Bernie's Angels". Also for Fox, Kwapis was one of the main creative forces behind Grounded for Life, a hybrid comedy combining single- and multi-camera techniques. Kwapis experimented with the form even further in the pilot of Watching Ellie, Julia Louis-Dreyfus' follow-up to Seinfeld. The distinctive pilot has a story that unfolds in real time, with an on-screen clock. Playing the role of Ellie's ex-boyfriend is Steve Carell, with whom Kwapis would shortly collaborate on his next major project.

In 2005, Kwapis was instrumental in adapting the BBC mockumentary, The Office, for American television under the same title, for NBC. He directed the pilot and had a significant impact on the look of the entire program—including the iconic set design. Showrunner Greg Daniels, production designer Donald Lee Harris, and he developed an open floor plan that allowed camera operators to catch characters "unaware". And they purposely created an office layout with immovable walls to emphasize its airless, claustrophobic atmosphere. Kwapis went on to direct 13 additional episodes, including the 100th episode of the series, "Company Picnic", and the series finale. His work on the third-season premiere, "Gay Witch Hunt", earned him a second Primetime Emmy Award nomination for Outstanding Directing for a Comedy Series.

For Showtime Independent Pictures, Kwapis wrote and directed Sexual Life (2005), loosely based on Arthur Schnitzler's satiric story taking place in fin-de-siècle Vienna, La Ronde.

Kwapis' next feature was another adaptation, Sisterhood of the Traveling Pants (Warner Bros., 2006), based on the bestselling young adult novel by Ann Brashares. Sisterhood, a coming-of-age story about four sixteen-year-old friends, stars Amber Tamblyn, Alexis Bledel, America Ferrera, and Blake Lively (her screen debut).

His next feature, License to Wed (Warner Bros., 2007), follows a young couple (Mandy Moore and John Krasinski), as they embark upon an unorthodox pre-marital course, devised by a highly mischievous and somewhat perverse minister (Robin Williams). Designed to determine their compatibility, the course compresses the first ten years of marriage into one week.

Kwapis' follow-up was another look at romantic entanglements, He's Just Not That Into You (New Line Cinema, 2009). The film is adapted from the bestselling advice book by Greg Behrendt and Liz Tuccillo, which encouraged people to learn to read romantic signals correctly. The film stars Ben Affleck, Jennifer Aniston, Drew Barrymore, Jennifer Connelly, Kevin Connolly, Bradley Cooper, Ginnifer Goodwin, Scarlett Johansson, and Justin Long.

2010s
Kwapis launched his seventh series and directed his tenth feature film in 2010. He was the executive producer and director of the pilot of Outsourced, a half-hour comedy for NBC. Adapted from the 2006 feature film of the same name, Outsourced tells the story of a Kansas City-based novelties company that ships all of its customer service jobs to India. The one American employee not to be fired, Todd Dempsey (Ben Rappaport), goes to Mumbai to oversee the call center.

For Working Title Films, and Universal Pictures, Kwapis directed the rescue adventure Big Miracle, starring Drew Barrymore and John Krasinski. Based on a real event that took place in 1988, the film tells the tale of a small town newsman (Krasinski) and a Greenpeace volunteer (Barrymore) who are joined by rival world superpowers to save a family of gray whales trapped in the ice of the Arctic Ocean. The film was shot during fall 2010 in Alaska and released in 2012.

In 2013, nine years after bringing the pilot to U.S. television, Kwapis directed the series finale of The Office. He also produced the half-hour Showtime pilot Happyish, written by Shalom Auslander and starring Philip Seymour Hoffman. The project stalled after Hoffman's death, but was eventually recast with Steve Coogan. It made its debut on Showtime in April 2015 and, in addition to producing, Kwapis directed four of its episodes.

In 2014, Kwapis directed the feature film A Walk in the Woods, based on the bestselling travel memoir by Bill Bryson. The film stars Robert Redford and Nick Nolte as two old friends who decide to walk the 2,100-mile Appalachian Trail. The film, which was co-produced by Redford, also stars Emma Thompson and Mary Steenburgen, and premiered at the Sundance Film Festival in January 2015. A Walk in the Woods was released by Broad Green on September 2, 2015.

Kwapis returned to single-camera half-hour comedy in 2016 and directed four episodes of Tig Notaro's semi-autobiographical Internet television series, One Mississippi—two per season in 2016 and 2017. The show was produced by Amazon Studios. For Netflix, he has directed episodes of Santa Clarita Diet, a comedy starring and produced by Drew Barrymore and first released February 3, 2017.

2020s

In April 2020, Netflix released the first season of the show #BlackAF, created by and starring Kenya Barris, three episodes of which were directed by Kwapis.

Kwapis was a guest on the July 15, 2020 episode of the podcast Office Ladies, hosted by The Office stars Jenna Fischer and Angela Kinsey, to discuss his work on The Office and, specifically, the season two finale, Casino Night, which he directed.

An autobiographical memoir of Kwapis' career in film and televisionBut What I Really Want to do is Directwas released October 6, 2020 by St. Martin's Griffin. An excerpt was published in The Los Angeles Review of Books and Entertainment Weekly and the Saint Louis Post-Dispatch featured interviews with Kwapis about it. Film academic David Bordwell favorably reviewed it, saying, the book "...ranks with Sidney Lumet's Making Movies and Alexander Mackendrick's On Film-Making, the most acute personal reflections on Hollywood directing." Kwapis has used his book as the premise for master classes at the Sundance Institute and the St. Louis International Film Festival.

Producer Greg Daniels and actor/producer Steve Carell, both of whom worked with Kwapis on The Office, hired him to direct all seven episodes of season two of Space Force, which was released by Netflix on February 18, 2022. Producer Daniels explained that they refocused the tone and emphases of the show for the second season and that they had brought Kwapis in to help achieve that goal.

Filmography

Film

Television

References

External links
 
 Ken Kwapis on Office Ladies podcast (July 15, 2020)

But What I Really Want to Do Is Direct: Lessons from a Life Behind the Camera  official book website
 Book review by David Bordwell.

American television directors
American people of Polish descent
Catholics from Illinois
People from Belleville, Illinois
1957 births
Living people
USC School of Cinematic Arts alumni
Northwestern University School of Communication alumni
Film directors from Illinois